John Gilman may refer to:

 John Gilman (activist), American activist
 John Taylor Gilman, American farmer, shipbuilder and politician
 John J. Gilman, American material scientist
 John M. Gilman, American politician and lawyer